Dwight Anderson (born July 5, 1981) is a former professional Canadian football defensive back in the Canadian Football League (CFL). He was signed by the St. Louis Rams as an undrafted free agent in 2004. He played college football at South Dakota.

Anderson was also a member of the Carolina Panthers, Philadelphia Soul, Hamilton Tiger-Cats, Calgary Stampeders, Montreal Alouettes, Saskatchewan Roughriders and Toronto Argonauts.

Early years
In high school, Anderson starred on the football field for Bloomfield High School in Bloomfield, Connecticut.  There he earned All-State football honors from the New Haven Register in 1999.

References

External links
Just Sports Stats
Toronto Argonauts bio
 https://www.tsn.ca/cfl/story/?id=354121

1981 births
Living people
American football defensive backs
Calgary Stampeders players
Canadian football defensive backs
Carolina Panthers players
Hamilton Tiger-Cats players
Jamaican players of American football
Philadelphia Soul players
St. Louis Rams players
South Dakota Coyotes football players
Toronto Argonauts players
Jamaican players of Canadian football
People from Spanish Town
Bloomfield High School (Connecticut) alumni